The Big 12 Conference members of the Associated Press held a vote in 2010 and voted on the best players during the Big 12 Conference's 15-year existence.

Note: Players in bold were selected. Players not in bold only received votes.

Offense

Defense

Special teams

Other

School summary

Voters
The voters were Lee Barfknecht, Omaha (Neb.) World-Herald; Kelly Beaton, Waterloo-Cedar Falls (Iowa) Courier; Kirk Bohls, Austin (Texas) American-Statesman; Jimmy Burch, Fort Worth (Texas) Star-Telegram; Chuck Carlton, The Dallas Morning News; Robert Cessna, Bryan Eagle; Mike Finger, San Antonio Express-News; Vahe Gregorian, St. Louis Post-Dispatch; Bill Haisten, Tulsa (Okla.) World; Kevin Haskin, Topeka Capital-Journal; Brian Howell, Longmont (Colo.) Daily Times-Call; Tom Keegan, Lawrence Journal-World; Blair Kerkhoff, Kansas City Star; Bobby La Gesse, Ames (Iowa) Tribune; Dave Matter, Columbia (Mo.) Daily Tribune; Kyle Ringo, Boulder (Colo.) Daily Camera; John Shinn, Norman (Okla.) Transcript; Jake Trotter, The Oklahoman; John Werner, Waco (Texas) Tribune-Herald; Don Williams, Lubbock (Texas) Avalanche-Journal.

References

External links
 http://sports.espn.go.com/ncf/news/story?id=5846088
 http://hosted.ap.org/specials/interactives/_sports/fbc_big_12/?SITE=OKOKL&SECTION=HOME?KeepThis=true&TB_iframe=true&height=650&width=800

2010 Big 12 Conference football season
Big 12 Conference football
College football conference awards and honors